Riesman is a surname. Notable people with the surname include:

 David Riesman (1909–2002), American sociologist
 David Riesman (physician) (1867–1940), German-born American physician
 Michael Riesman, composer, conductor, keyboardist, and record producer

See also
 Reisman
 Riesman's sign